Judith Anne Stone AM (born 1 January 1942) is an Australian pop and country music singer. For much of the 1960s she was a regular performer on the music variety Bandstand,  Stone's top 20 singles on the national charts are "I'll Step Down" (No. 19, February 1962), "4,003,221 Tears from Now" (April 1964), "Born a Woman" (No. 3, September 1966) and "Would You Lay with Me" (No. 2, June 1974). On the Queen's Birthday Honours List of June 2006, Stone was awarded a Member of the Order of Australia, with the citation, "For service to the community as an entertainer at fundraising events for a range of charitable organisations, and as a singer."

Early life
Stone grew up in the Sydney suburb of Granville. She has two younger sisters, Joyce and Janice. From a young age she sang country music at home and her parents bought her a guitar, which she learned to play.

Career 
In her early teens Stone entered and won a local talent contest and was noticed by an attendee, Reg Lindsay. By November 1956 she had joined his touring performance troupe, the Reg Lindsay Show, and stayed for 18 months. In July 1957 a reviewer of Lindsay's show in Cabramatta for The Biz wrote that "Little Judy Stone, of Granville, was very pleasing in her turn."

Stone hired Kevin Jacobsen as her talent agent. She described meeting him, "I used to sing, with a heavy guitar, Western style numbers. Once I met Kevin he gave me one instruction: 'Throw that guitar out the window.' Although I did not throw it out any window, I am now singing without any of my own musical accompaniment." Jacobsen's older brother, Col Joye, was an established pop singer and regular performer on Bandstand, a TV music show. Stone supported his group, Joye and the Joy Boys, on their tours of South Australia, Victoria and Queensland. Stone, as a young performer, had been billed as "The Cowgirl from Granville" but on her first appearance on Bandstand she was mistakenly announced as "The Callgirl from Granville". By May 1961 she had also appeared on other TV music shows, Teen Time and Six O'Clock Rock.

Jacobsen had Stone signed with Festival Records and in June 1961 she issued her debut single, "You're Driving Me Mad" – a cover version of the 1958 song by United States singer, Jo Ann Campbell. For the track she was backed by the Joy Boys. In August she relocated to Melbourne, for three months, to appear on Graham Kennedy's In Melbourne Tonight variety TV show. She expected that "While in Melbourne most of my shows will be adult performances, which will be a change from the present teenagers' shows." Her third single, "I'll Step Down", was released in February 1962 and became a top 10 hit in Sydney and top 20 in Brisbane. The Biz correspondent compared it to her earlier single, "Although very different to 'You're Driving Me Mad', this still possesses the inimitable style of this great little local star." Also in that year Stone issued her debut album, I'll Step Down, on Festival.

In 1963 she recorded "It Takes a Lot (To Make Me Cry)" on which the Bee Gees (Barry, Robin and Maurice Gibb) sing backup vocals; it was released as a single in July. Her seventh single, "4,003,221 Tears from Now", was released in April 1964. It is a cover version of the 1963 single by US singer Kerri Downs (aka Mary Lou Kiernan). According to Australian musicologist, Ian McFarlane, it "became Stone's most popular release of the 1960s. The heart-wrenching ballad... [which] peaked at #8 in Sydney and #7 in Melbourne."

Aside from her solo releases, Stone was often teamed with Col Joye in duets for singles, extended plays and albums. McFarlane found their work "contained cutesy material like 'Young and Healthy', 'Angry' and 'Side by Side'." In early 1965 Stone with Col Joye and the Joy Boys undertook a tour of Japan for two months. In September 1966 she covered "Born a Woman" by US singer, Sandy Posey. It was a top 10 hit in Sydney.

From the late 1960s and into the early 1970s Stone "consolidated on her early pop successes with regular appearances on the club and country music circuits." Later singles included, "Mare Mare Mare" (January 1974), "Would You Lay with Me (In a Field of Stone)" (No. 2, June 1974), "Silver Wings and Golden Rings" (February 1975) and "Hasta Mañana" (May 1976).

In 2007 Stone performed a duet with Scottish singer-songwriter Isla Grant on the track "What's a Girl to Do?" for Grant's album, Down Memory Lane.

Personal life 

On 25 February 1966, Stone married fellow musician, Leo de Kroo. The de Kroo brothers, Leo and Doug, were a duo who also appeared on Bandstand and other pop music shows. The marriage ended in divorce five years later, Stone reflected, "I blamed myself when it ended, then I realized something its taken a long time to learn – singing is my life... I don't have a social life – there simply isn't time – but I don't get lonely; I have my family."

In January 1992 Stone was diagnosed with throat cancer, at the same time as her fellow Bandstand regular, Peter Allen. Both Stone and Allen were operated on the same day by the same surgeon. In June Stone was still in recovery when she learned of Allen's death, she recalled that after the operation "He came into my room to see me because he was going back to the States and I just wanted to give him a big hug — he looked so ill."

On the Queen's Birthday Honours List of June 2006, Stone was awarded a Member of the Order of Australia, with the citation, "For service to the community as an entertainer at fundraising events for a range of charitable organisations, and as a singer." In January 2014 she was made Australia Day Ambassador for regional celebrations in Laurieton, Wauchope and Port Macquarie.

Discography

Studio albums
{| class="wikitable plainrowheaders" style="text-align:center;" border="1"
|+ List of albums, with Australian chart positions
! scope="col" rowspan="2" | Title
! scope="col" rowspan="2" | Album details
! scope="col" colspan="1" | Peak chartpositions
|-
! scope="col" style="text-align:center;" | AUS
|-
! scope="row" | I'll Step Down
|
 Released: 1962
 Format: LP
 Label: Festival Records (FL 30805)
| align="center" 
|-
! scope="row" | Col and Judy (by Col Joye and Judy Stone)
|
 Released: 1962
 Format: LP
 Label: Festival Records (FL 30901)
| align="center" 
|-
! scope="row" | Got You on My Mind 
|
 Released: 1964
 Format: LP
 Label: Festival Records (FL 31331)
| align="center" 
|-
! scope="row" | Pure Stone''' 
|
 Released: 1971
 Format: LP
 Label: Frog Records Australia (FLP-001)
| align="center"| -
|-
! scope="row" | Born to Lose 
|
 Released: 1972
 Format: LP
 Label: Universal Summit (SRA250.116)
| align="center"| -
|-
! scope="row" | In a Field of Stone 
|
 Released: 1974
 Format: LP
 Label: M7 (MLFA 070)
| align="center"| 63
|-
! scope="row" | A Part of Me 
|
 Released: 1976
 Format: LP
 Label: Universal Summit (SCD 499 027)
| align="center"| -
|}

 Extended plays 
 I Cried'' – (June 1964) Festival Records

Singles

Other singles

Awards and nominations

King of Pop Awards
The King of Pop Awards were voted by the readers of TV Week. The King of Pop award started in 1967 and ran through to 1978.

|-
| 1972
| herself 
| Best Dressed Female
| 
|-

Mo Awards
The Australian Entertainment Mo Awards (commonly known informally as the Mo Awards), were annual Australian entertainment industry awards. They recognise achievements in live entertainment in Australia from 1975 to 2016. Judy Stone won nine awards in that time.
 (wins only)
|-
| 1981
| Judy Stone
| Country Female of the Year
| 
|-
| 1982
| Judy Stone
| Country Female of the Year
| 
|-
| 1983
| Judy Stone
| Country Female of the Year
| 
|-
| 1984
| Judy Stone
| Country Female Entertainer of the Year
| 
|-
| 1985
| Judy Stone
| Country Female Entertainer of the Year
| 
|-
| 1986
| Judy Stone
| Country Female Entertainer of the Year
| 
|-
| 1987
| Judy Stone
| Country Female Entertainer of the Year
| 
|-
| 1988
| Judy Stone
| Country Female Entertainer of the Year
| 
|-
| 2007
| Judy Stone
| Hall of Fame
| 
|-

References

 Noel McGrath's Australian Encyclopaedia of Rock & Pop, 1978
 An Australian Rock Discography, Chris Spencer, 1990, Moonlight Publishing
 The Who's Who of Australian Rock, Chris Spencer, Moonlight Publishing

External links

Judy Stone webpage, ATA All Star Artist

1942 births
Living people
Australian country singers
Australian women pop singers
Logie Award winners
Singers from Sydney